Kazimierz Moskal  (born 9 January 1967) is a Polish retired footballer who currently serves as the manager of I liga side ŁKS Łódź.

Moskal made six appearances for the Poland national football team, scoring one goal.

References

External links

 
Profile at Historia Wisły

1967 births
Living people
Sportspeople from Lesser Poland Voivodeship
People from Myślenice County
Polish footballers
Poland international footballers
Association football midfielders
Wisła Kraków players
Lech Poznań players
Hapoel Tel Aviv F.C. players
Maccabi Ironi Ashdod F.C. players
Expatriate footballers in Israel
Górnik Zabrze players
Hutnik Nowa Huta players
Polish football managers
Ekstraklasa managers
I liga managers
Wisła Kraków managers
Bruk-Bet Termalica Nieciecza managers
GKS Katowice managers
Pogoń Szczecin managers
Sandecja Nowy Sącz managers
ŁKS Łódź managers
Zagłębie Sosnowiec managers